The following lists events that happened during 2015 in Bahrain.

Incumbents
 Monarch: Hamad ibn Isa Al Khalifa
 Prime Minister: Khalifa bin Salman Al Khalifa

Events

January
 January 17 - The Bahraini government clashes with the protesters.

References

 
2010s in Bahrain
Years of the 21st century in Bahrain
Bahrain
Bahrain